Gamhariya is a village development committee in Parsa District in the Narayani Zone of southern Nepal. At the time of the 2011 Nepal census it had a population of 4,176 people living in 602 individual households. There were 2,221 males and 1,955 females at the time of census.

References

Populated places in Parsa District